Olia (Ukrainian: ОЛЯ) is a Ukrainian talk show broadcasting on Novyi Kanal. It is an adaptation of the American TV show The Ellen DeGeneres Show. Olha Freimut is presenter of the show.

Synopsis 
The show is entertaining, it focuses on coverage of topical topics that have been violated within a few days before the ether.

The project is broadcast on Novyi Kanal four days a week - from Tuesday to Friday.

The guests of the project are stars of different sizes and directions, such as Serhiy Prytula, Iryna Bilyk, Mélovin, Jamala and others like that. Similarly, in each issue there appears a hero from non-public people, but with this man has some great achievement in his life, a meaningful act, an unusual passion or skill. During the entire release, the presenter actively contacts the audience in the hall.

Adaptation
The show is an adaptation of the American talk show The Ellen DeGeneres Show, which is the winner of the 4th Emmy Award and 11 times nominees for this award. The Olia show is the first legal adaptation of the American project in the world.

Controversy

Censorship and Ukrainian disapproval
The show introduced the practice of visiting online enemies, the rubric was called "Heathers: I LOVE YOU". Olha Fremut visited people who insult her on the Internet, in the format of the show "Olia". In many ways this part of the program has been condemned.

By the end of the first season of the show, many Ukrainian media have published news about the failure of the show on Ukrainian television and its further closure. The main reason was given the mentality of the Ukrainians, who do not like the format of the show, suitable for Americans. The Novyi Kanal has not made any official statements on this matter.

References

External links 
 Шоу «ОЛЯ» on the site of the Novyi Kanal.
 
 ОЛЯ Шоу // Facebook

2010s Ukrainian television series debuts
Ukrainian television talk shows
Ukrainian television series based on American television series
Novyi Kanal original programming